Crucifixion with the Virgin Mary, St John and St Mary Magdalene is a painting by Anthony van Dyck. He produced it in 1617-19 as the high altarpiece for the Jesuit church in Bergues, near Dunkirk, during his time as an assistant painter to Peter Paul Rubens - for a long time the painting was even attributed to Rubens. It was paid to Rubens in 1621 and seems to have been sold around 1746. It was bought by Louis XV of France in Antwerp in 1749 to be the high altarpiece of Saint-Louis de Versailles at the Palace of Versailles. It is now in the Louvre, in Paris.

References

External links
http://cartelfr.louvre.fr/cartelfr/visite?srv=car_not_frame&idNotice=4931

Religious paintings by Anthony van Dyck
1619 paintings
van Dyck
Paintings in the Louvre by Dutch, Flemish and German artists
Paintings of the Virgin Mary
Paintings depicting Mary Magdalene
Altarpieces